The Mack NM 6-ton 6x6 truck, officially "Prime Mover Cargo truck (G-535)", was Mack's first military 6x6. It debuted as a prime mover in 1940, and was used for towing AA guns, and ammunition. Gun crews rode in its canvas covered bed. The NM's enclosed cab came from the commercial L-model. Many NM's were used by the British as recovery vehicles.

Technical data
Gearbox: Mack TR36 5-speed direct-top
Transfer Case: Timken-Detroit 2-speed T77 with 2.55 low
Wheelbase: Tires 9.75-22 (NM-1, -2, -3 Lee commercial with highway tread)

Models
The NM-1 and NM-2 had an amidships mounted winch with a capstan head. The cargo body had troop seats, a canvas cover, and a spare wheel on the front right side. NM-2 had smaller head lamps and parking lamps on top.

The NM-3 was the last model to have an enclosed cab. It was similar to the NM-1 and NM-2 except for:
front pintle for positioning artillery pieces, arched bumper (front pintle under the arche), smaller brush guard, side lights on mudguards, towing hooks on bumper deleted, radiator shell with Mack nameplate.

There was no NM-4, the prototype NN-2 did not go into production.

The NM-5 and NM-6 had a soft top cab with folding windscreen. It had a wooden cargo body with two spare tires at the front right and left. They had some technical detail changes. The only differences between the NM-5 and NM-6 were rifle brackets in the cab and jerrycan holders left of the winch for the NM-6.

NM-7 and NM-8 were like the NM-5 and NM-6. There were only minor detail modifications.
Some were equipped with the gun-carriage brake cylinder: this was an air-cylinder from Hanna for the simultaneous actuation (cable operated) of the air brakes of the truck and the mechanical brakes of the gun.

Gallery

See also
Mack trucks
Mack EH
Mack M123 and M125
Mack NR

References

Notes

Bibliography

TM 10-1476
SNL G-535

Military trucks of the United States
NM
World War II military vehicles
Military vehicles introduced from 1940 to 1944